Herbert Pearce (6 January 1919 – 21 August 2002) was a Welsh communist.

Born in Pembroke Dock, Pearce was educated at the Pembroke Dock County School and followed his parents in joining the Labour Party, while working as a clerk.  In 1938, he moved to Birmingham and joined the Communist Party of Great Britain (CPGB), working full-time for the party from 1941.  He was also active in the Clerical and Administrative Workers Union and on Birmingham Trades Council.

Pearce filled a number of different roles for the CPGB; from 1953 to 1960, he was Secretary of the Birmingham City area, then he became Secretary of the Welsh District of the CPGB, serving until 1984.  Following the Prague Spring of 1968, he began to be critical of the Soviet Union, and was vocal on his support for Welsh devolution.  He also served on the editorial board of Marxism Today, and on the CPGB's Executive Committee.

Pearce stood in several elections, including the 1955 and 1959 general elections in Birmingham Perry Barr, the 1963 Swansea East by-election, and Neath at the 1970 general election, and locally in Birmingham and later Cardiff.

The CPGB dissolved in 1991, and Pearce supported its successor, Democratic Left.  He devoted much of this period to caring for his wife.  In 1998, Nelson Mandela visited Cardiff and, in his speech, thanked Pearce for his support during the anti-apartheid movement.

References

1919 births
2002 deaths
Communist Party of Great Britain members
People from Pembroke Dock